The Royal Academy of Fine Arts of Ghent (KASK) is an art school that is one of the oldest art schools in Belgium.  It is now part of the Hogeschool Gent.

History
The Academy was founded in 1748 as a school for drawing by the painter, Philippe Karel Marissal, at his home. The Academy was granted a royal charter in 1771 by empress Maria Theresa of Austria.

In 1995, the Academy was one of the sixteen educational institutions that were merged into the Hogeschool Gent.

Staff 

 Carl De Keyzer
 Pieter-Frans De Noter (1779–1842)
 Félix De Vigne (1806–1862)
 Jean-François Portaels (1818–1895)
 Raoul Servais
 Frits Van den Berghe (1883–1939)
 Roger Wittevrongel

Alumni 

 Dirk Braeckman
 Joseph-Pierre Braemt (1796–1864)
Omer Coppens (1864–1926), impressionist 
 Walter De Buck (1934–2014) 
 Jan De Cock
 Valerius De Saedeleer (1867–1941)
 Gustave De Smet (1877–1943)
 Anna De Weert (1867–1950)
 Gerda Dendooven
 Lukas Dhont
 Nick Ervinck
 Mous Lamrabat (born 1983) Moroccan-born Belgian photographer
 Frans Masereel (1889–1972)
 George Minne (1866–1941)
 Constant Montald (1862–1944)
 Joseph Paelinck (1781–1839)
 Constant Permeke (1886–1952)
 Max Pinckers
 Raoul Servais
 Gustave Van de Woestyne (1881–1947)
 Frits Van den Berghe (1883–1939)
 Felix Van Groeningen
 Jan Van Imschoot
 Geo Verbanck (1881–1961)
 Roger Wittevrongel

References

External links 

Art schools in Belgium
1741 establishments in Europe
Education in Ghent
Culture of Ghent
Organisations based in Belgium with royal patronage